The Ruskin Museum is a small local museum in Coniston, Cumbria, northern England.

It was established in 1901 by W. G. Collingwood, an artist and antiquarian who had worked as secretary to art critic John Ruskin. The museum is both a memorial to Ruskin and a local museum covering the history and heritage of Coniston Water and the Lake District.

The museum is a registered charity in England & Wales, constituted as The Coniston Institute and Ruskin Museum.

Collections & exhibits

Its collections include material on the copper and slate mines of the region, geology, lace making, farming, and writer Arthur Ransome.

A larger collection is devoted to the life and work of John Ruskin.

A specialist collection covers the achievements of Donald Campbell, who died while attempting a new water speed record on Coniston Water. In December 2006, his daughter Gina Campbell donated Bluebird K7, which had been salvaged over recent years, to the Ruskin Museum on behalf of the whole Campbell family. A new wing was built to house Bluebird and an associated exhibition, which was completed in 2010.

There is now uncertainty about the future of the boat. This is characterised as due to the conflicting desires of both parties, although both the Bluebird Project and the Ruskin Museum have expressed a desire to see Bluebird K7 run on occasion. The original recovered material is now the property of the museum while Bluebird Project claims that it owns the newly fabricated parts of the boat. In June 2021, the museum wrote to Bluebird Project requiring the return of either the complete restored craft, or any original material of Bluebird K7 "together with together with any components that effectively became part of the original 'Property' via legal rules of 'Accession'."

In the grounds of the museum stands 'Riverdale', an extensive collection of over sixty miniature structures including houses, bridges and farm buildings which were hand-made by local builder John Usher (1940-1993). Based on local vernacular architecture, the slate and stone structures were removed from Usher's former home Brow Head after his death, with the largest collection being rehomed at the museum in 1999.

Developments
In the 1980s, the museum was identified as one of the collections in the North West of England most at risk and a project was launched to secure its long-term future. An £850,000 development scheme (funded by the Heritage Lottery Fund, European Regional Development Fund, Foundation for Sport and the Arts, the Rural Development Commission and others) was started.  The interpretive design for the Ruskin Museum received an Association for Heritage Interpretation Interpret Britain Award in 1999. The restored museum with its new extension re-opened to the public in May 1999 and was officially opened by the then Culture Secretary, the Rt. Honourable Chris Smith on 23 May 2000.

In 2017/18, architect Takeshi Hayatsu worked with tutors and students from Central Saint Martins in London and Grizedale Arts to design and install a  kiosk adjacent to the museum, with surface copper tiles decorated by local people. The kiosk provides information on the area's copper mining history. The museum grounds also include a community bread oven by Hayatsu and students, a project that was shortlisted for the Architects Journal Small Projects Awards 2018.

See also

 Armitt Library
 Brantwood
 Ruskin Library

References

Museums established in 1901
Musical instrument museums
Biographical museums in Cumbria
Local museums in Cumbria
1901 establishments in England
John Ruskin